The X10 class is a class of steam locomotives previously operated by the New South Wales Government Railways of Australia.

History
When the NSWGR steam locomotive classification was renumbered in 1924, a number of smaller classes, including small 0-4-0 and 2-4-0 tank locomotives, all types of duplicates, yard and depot locomotives, crane locomotives, locomotive and accident cranes and special equipment were classified as the X10 class. Many were purchased from other government agencies and private lines. As such, this was an extremely diverse group of locomotives.

Included were the 18 members of the F.351 class and 8 members of M.36 class.

Locomotives

Breakdown Cranes

General Duties Cranes

Preservation
New South Wales M36 class locomotive

 1004 by the Transport Heritage NSW, static exhibit as Locomotive 78 
New South Wales F351 class locomotives
 1033 by the Transport Heritage NSW, static exhibit, passenger locomotive
 1042 at Maitland Steam Park, ex-Cardiff Locomotive Workshops shunter, under restoration

Gallery

References

External links 
 Dorrigo Steam Railway & Museum
 Preserved New South Wales Steam Locomotives
 Powerhouse Museum Collection listing
 New South Wales Rail Transport Museum Steam Exhibits

10